Anthony "Sonny" Cullen (10 July 1934 – 8 August 1999) was an Irish cyclist. He competed in the individual road race at the 1960 Summer Olympics.

References

External links
 

1934 births
1999 deaths
Irish male cyclists
Olympic cyclists of Ireland
Cyclists at the 1960 Summer Olympics
Sportspeople from Dublin (city)